Michel Sanchis (born 3 September 1951) is a French judoka. He competed in the men's middleweight event at the 1980 Summer Olympics.

References

1951 births
Living people
French male judoka
Olympic judoka of France
Judoka at the 1980 Summer Olympics
Place of birth missing (living people)